Alyesha Wise, aka "Ms. Wise" is a poet, teaching artist  and co-founder of Spoken Literature Art Movement (S.L.A.M). From Camden, N.J., Alyesha currently resides in Los Angeles where she also serves as a teaching artist for Street Poets, Inc. She previously served as the head coach of Da Poetry Lounge's slam team and a co-coach for the Get Lit Youth slam team. Wise co-founded and was a co-host of The Pigeon Presents: The Philadelphia Poetry Slam. She has been featured in a speaking engagement on the TEDx Talk series in which she dedicated the talk to her younger sister and Camden. While in Philadelphia, Wise was a co-host of Jus Words, the longest running weekly open mic in the city at the time. She also founded the organization Love, Us, a Philadelphia-based organization and annual production which worked to spread unity and self-love through the arts. The production was a large attraction in the Philadelphia poetry scene and a Twitter trending topic in 2010. She is currently the founder and organizer of Black Women Necessary, a safe space for black women. Wise also served as a former teaching artist and volunteer coordinator at New Earth, and continues to teach and mentor in Los Angeles youth detention centers. In 2017, she authored the book, Carnival. Ron Howard once said about Alyesha's performance style, "Very Powerful."

Awards 

 2018 2nd place Da Poetry Lounge National Poetry Slam
 2014 Da Poetry Lounge Hollywood Grand Slam Champion 
 Two-time Women of the World Poetry Slam finalist
 2012 Queens Inspire Kings award presented by Kings Rule Together
 2010 5th in the Women of the World Poetry Slam in 2010

Carnival 
Carnival was published by Not A Cult Media on May 30, 2018.

Black Women Necessary 
The group hosts frequent free of charge brunches as a part of an informal brunch. The meal switches locations and is usually held at a members home (as long as they have attended at least two brunches in the past). Members can make donations, but the event is free and is held to honor ancestors and relax.

Common themes expressed in Wise's poetry 

 Feminism 
 African-American culture
 Self-love
 Bodies and inherited trauma
 Social Justice
 Queerness
 Sexual assault

Education 
She attended Medical Arts High School and graduated with a B.A. in Psychology from Rowan College in Glassboro, N.J.

Notable performances 

 "We Will" with ACLU of Southern California
"Raising Her By Raising Myself" TEDx
 "Cannibal (A Poem to White Supremacy)"
 "To This Black Woman Body, Part I"
 "A Story of My Love Affair With Prince"
 Originally performed at PhilaMOCA in Philadelphia for the TV show, Articulate on WHYY.

Personal life

Early life 
Wise is originally from Camden, New Jersey. She has five siblings (Wise is the second oldest girl) and was raised mostly by her mother. Her parents got divorced when she was five. After watching Poetic Justice, at age 11, she wrote her first poem titled, "Black History." Her favorite book as a child was Things Fall Apart by Chinua Achebe.

Adulthood 
She moved to Philadelphia in 2006. Wise identified as a lesbian for eight years, and has had relationships with women. At the moment, she is married to a man and thus identifies as bisexual.

Bibliography

References 

American women poets
21st-century American poets
Slam poets
Living people
21st-century American women writers
Year of birth missing (living people)